Whatcom Community College (WCC or Whatcom) is a public community college in Bellingham, Washington, in Whatcom County. Established in 1967, Whatcom has been accredited by the Northwest Commission on Colleges and Universities since 1976.

Academics 
Whatcom offers transfer degrees, professional and technical training programs, basic education, job skills, online courses, and Community & Continuing Education classes.

Student demographics

Demographics 
 56% female; 44% male
 68% between the ages of 16–24
 76% from Whatcom County (of students 20 and younger)
 53% attending full-time (12 credits or more)
 21% students of color (of degree/certificate seeking students)
 42% first-generation (of degree/certificate seeking students)

Student profiles 
 6,832 credit seeking students annually
 1,110 Running Start students annually (569 FTE)
 300+ international students from 30 countries
 239 veterans annually
 4,056 Community & Continuing Education students annually

Campus 
WCC's 72-acre campus, located in north Bellingham, is made up of 12 buildings: Auxiliary Services Building, Baker Hall, Cascade Hall, Foundation Building, Health Professions Education Center, Heiner Center, Kelly Hall, Kulshan Hall, Laidlaw Center, Pavilion, Roe Studio, and Syre Student Center.

Athletics 
WCC competes in the Northern Region of the Northwest Athletic Conference (NWAC). WCC has intercollegiate teams in three sports: men's and women's soccer, women's volleyball and men's and women's basketball. Soccer and volleyball seasons begin in September and end in late November. Basketball begins in mid-November and runs through the end of February. All of the Orcas' home games are held in either the Pavilion or the Orca athletic field on campus.

Honors 
In October 2014, the National Security Agency and Department of Homeland Security designated Whatcom Community College as a national center of academic excellence in information assurance and cyber defense. WCC is among the first community colleges in the nation to earn this distinction.

Whatcom Community College was one of three schools to receive the Progress and Succeed Award from Hobsons, an education software and services company, in July 2014. The award recognized WCC for using the company's online student advising and support technology, which replaces manual processes and integrates degree planning, advising, and scheduling.

According to the Aspen Institute, WCC was among the nation's top 150 community colleges. The non-profit institute selected the colleges from a pool of more than 1,000 public two-year colleges that have demonstrated exceptional levels of student success. As of 2014, of Washington state's 34 community and technical colleges, Whatcom is one of six to receive this recognition.

WCC's auxiliary services building earned LEED Silver certification for its sustainable design elements. The building, which opened in spring 2013, is home to the campus facilities department and the copy, print and mail center.

During a high-profile White House cybersecurity meeting in August 2021, WCC announced they have been designated one of the National Science Foundation (NSF) Advanced Technological Education National Cybersecurity Centers. This will allow students to be fast tracked from academics to employment in cybersecurity and to train WCC's cybersecurity faculty.

References

Community colleges in Washington (state)
Universities and colleges in Bellingham, Washington
Educational institutions established in 1967
Universities and colleges accredited by the Northwest Commission on Colleges and Universities
Universities and colleges in Whatcom County, Washington